Josia ligata is a moth of the  family Notodontidae. It is found in Colombia and Ecuador.

Larvae have been recorded on Passiflora mollissima.

External links
Species page at Tree of Life project

Notodontidae of South America
Moths described in 1864